Oku (Ebkuo, Ekpwo, Ukfwo, Bvukoo, Kuɔ) is a Grassfields Bantoid language that is primarily spoken by the Oku people of northwest Cameroon, a fondom of the Tikar people. They are a different ethnic group from the Oku people of Sierra Leone.

Phonology

Consonants 

Oku has 21 consonant phonemes. The consonant phoneme inventory of the language is shown below.

Orthography 

The Oku alphabet has 25 letters.

References

External links 
 Oku Verb Morphology: Tense Aspect and Mood Information about the structure of the Oku language
 Oku - English Provisional Lexicon An alphabetical list of words in the Oku language

Ring languages
Languages of Cameroon